Markus Müller may refer to:
 Markus Müller (footballer)
 Markus Müller (gymnast)
 Markus Müller (physician)